The Tribal or F class was a class of destroyers built for the Royal Navy. Twelve ships were built between 1905 and 1908 and all saw service during World War I, where they saw action in the North Sea and English Channel as part of the 6th Flotilla and Dover Patrols.

Design
The preceding River- or E-class destroyers of 1903 had made  on the  provided by triple expansion steam engines and coal-fired boilers, although  was powered by steam turbines. In November 1904, the First Sea Lord "Jackie" Fisher proposed that the next class of destroyers should make at least  and should use oil-fired boilers and steam turbines as a means of achieving this. This resulted in a larger ship to provide the required doubling of installed power over their predecessors, but also pushed the design to the limits of capability of contemporary technology. As a result, the Tribals were severely compromised and a somewhat retrograde step after the successful River class; they were lightly built and proved to be fragile in service.

Design details were left to the individual builders, as was Royal Navy practice at the time for destroyers.  As a result, no two were alike and there was considerable heterogeneity of detail and appearance, Most noticeably the number of funnels varied from three, in Cossack and Ghurka, to six in Viking; the latter, with two single and two pairs of funnels becoming the only six-funneled destroyer ever built.  With a light mainmast aft, they were the first British destroyers to have two masts.

The first five ships were designed with the armament of three QF 12-pounder guns, an improvement from the single 12-pounder and five 6-pounder guns that the River class was completed with, while the number of torpedoes remained at two  tubes.  From the sixth ship (Saracen) onwards, however, the armament was again increased, to a pair of BL  guns, with one gun mounted forward and another on the quarterdeck. From October 1908, the first five ships were modified by adding another pair of 12 pounder guns.

The shift towards the larger Tribals also created a requirement for a complementary class of smaller "Coastal" destroyers  giving rise to the Cricket class of small TBD, of which 36 were built between 1905 and 1908. The result of this experiment was not ideal and for the following class of destroyers (the 'G', or Beagle, class)  the Admiralty reverted to a single, more uniform design for the 1908-9 programme.

Ships
Seven ships to the Admiralty specification were originally envisaged, but only five vessels were ordered and built under the 1905-06 Programme, all to their builders' own designs.

Five more vessels were proposed, but only two were ordered and built under the 1906-07 Programme.

A final five vessels were ordered and built under the 1907-08 Programme.

In October 1916, it was proposed on 8 November 1916 that the two undamaged 'ends' might be joined together, which was completed at Chatham Royal Dockyard 7 June 1917 by joining the undamaged fore section of Zulu and the rear section of Nubian respectively.

Notes

Bibliography

 

Destroyer classes